Helen is a feminine given name derived from the Ancient Greek name , Helenē (dialectal variants: , Helena, Elena, Welena), which descends from Proto-Hellenic *Ηwelénā, from a pre-Hellenic or late Proto-Indo-European *Swelénā (a solar deity), ultimately derived from the Indo-European root *swel- (to shine, warm).

Helen, worshipped as a goddess in Laconia and Rhodes, is a major character in Greek mythology. The name was widely used by early Christians due to Saint Helena, the mother of the emperor Constantine I, who according to legend found a piece of the cross on which Jesus Christ was crucified when she traveled to Jerusalem. Helen was very popular in the United States during the first half of the 20th century, when it was one of the top ten names for baby girls, but became less common following World War II.

People

 Helen of Greece and Denmark (1896–1982), Queen Mother of Romania
 Saint Helen of Serbia (died 1314), Serbian queen
 Helen Acquroff (1831–1887), Scottish pianist, singer, poet and music teacher
 Helen Adams (born 1978), British television personality
 Helen Atkinson-Wood (born 1955), English actress
 Helen Vickroy Austin (1829–1921), American journalist, horticulturist, suffragette
 Helen Ball, senior British police officer
 Helen Morton Barker (1834-1910), American social reformer
 Helen Bar-Yaacov, Uzbekistani-born American rabbi
 Helen Baxendale (born 1970), English actress
 Helen Purdy Beale (1893–1976), US virologist
 Helen Corinne Bergen (1868–1???), American author, journalist, critic
 Helen Louisa Bostwick Bird (1826–1907), American author, poet 
 Helen Bjørnøy (born 1954), Norwegian politician
 Helen Marie Black (1896–1988), American cultural and civic leader, publicist, and journalist
 Helen Blatch (1934–2015), British actress
 Helen Brew (1922–2013), New Zealand actor, birth campaigner, documentary filmmaker, educator and speech therapist for children
 Helen Broderick (1891–1959), American actress
 Helen Brook (1907–1997), British advocate of birth control
 Helen Brown (1917–1986), New Zealand painter
 Helen Stuart Campbell (1839–1918), American author, editor, social reformer, home economist 
 Helen Chadwick (1953–1996), English artist
 Helen Clark (born 1950), New Zealand politician
 Helen Clark (born 1954), British politician
 Helen Taggart Clark (1849–1918), American journalist, poet 
 Helen Field Comstock (1840–1930), American poet, philanthropist
 Helen J. Cooper, British chemist
 Helen Millar Craggs (1888–1969), British suffragette and pharmacist, later 2nd Baroness Pethick-Lawrence
 Helen Cross (born 1967), English author
 Helen Cross, Australian politician
 Helen D'Amato, Maltese politician and educator
 Helen Joy Davidman (1915–1960), American poet and writer
 Helen Davies (disambiguation), multiple people
 Helen Denerley (born 1956), Scottish sculptor
 Helen DeWitt (born 1957), American novelist
 Helen Don-Duncan (born 1981), English swimmer
 Helen Merrill Egerton (1866–1951), Canadian writer 
 Helen Flanagan (born 1990), English actress
 Helen Frankenthaler (1928–2011), American painter
 Helen Fraser (feminist), later Moyes (1881–1979), Scottish suffragette, feminist, educationalist, politician emigrated to Australia, toured America to develop  WWI Women's Land Army.
 Helen Gamboa (born 1945), Filipina actress
 Helen Gandy (1897–1988), American civil servant
 Helen Garner (born 1942), Australian author
 Helen Golay (born 1931), American woman who murdered two homeless men for life insurance money
 Helen Grant (born 1961), British politician
 Helen Grant (born 1964), English author
 Helen Grant (born 1979), English field hockey player
 Helen Hakena (born 1955), organiser and campaigner for peace and women's rights from Bougainville, Papua New Guinea
 Helen Hayes (1900–1993), American actress
 Helen Anne Henderson (1946–2015), Canadian journalist and disability rights activist
 Helen Hindpere, Estonian writer
 Helen Humes (1913–1981), American singer
 Helen Hunt (born 1963), American actress
 Helen Marr Hurd (1839–1909), American educator, poet 	
 Helen Hunt Jackson (1830–1855), American poet, writer, activist 
 Helen Jacobs (1908–1997), American tennis player
 Helen G. James, American equality activist 
 Helen Kane (1904–1966), American singer
 Helen Keller (1880–1968), American author, political activist and lecturer
 Helen Klaos (born 1983), Estonian badminton player
 Helen Aldrich De Kroyft (1818–1915), American author
 Helen Landgarten (1921–2011), American psychotherapist, art therapy pioneer
 Helen Dortch Longstreet (1863–1962), American newspaper editor, publisher 
 Helen MacRae (active 1909–1914), British suffragette 	
 Helen Marshall (1898–1988), American historian of nursing
 Helene Mayer (1910–1953), German fencer
 Helen Mayo (1878–1967), Australian medical doctor and medical educator
 Helen McCall (1899–1956), Canadian photographer
 Helen McCrory (1968–2021), English actress
 Helen Maud Merrill (1865–1943), American litterateur, poet 
 Helen Mirren (born 1945), English actress
 Helen Molesworth (born 1966), American contemporary art curator
 Helen Moore (disambiguation), multiple people
 Helen Morgan (1900–1941), American singer
 Helen Morse (born 1947), Australian actress
 Helen Moses (1905–1985), American swimmer
 Helen Nielsen (1918–2002), American writer
 Helen O'Connell (1920–1993), American singer, actress, and hostess 
 Helen Betty Osborne (1952–1971), Canadian murder victim
 Helen Pai, American television writer, director, and producer
 Helén Pettersson (born 1972), Swedish politician
 Helen Philemon (born 1980), track and field athlete from Papua New Guinea
 Helen Plaschinski (born 1963), Mexican swimmer
 Helen Beatrix Potter (1866–1943), English author, illustrator and natural scientist
 Helen Reddy (1941–2020), Australian-American singer-songwriter and actress
 Helen Hinsdale Rich (1827–1915), American writer 
 Helen Richardson-Walsh (born 1981), an English field hockey player
 Helen Rickerby, New Zealand poet, writer, editor and publisher
 Helen Rockel (born 1945), New Zealand painter
 Helen Roden (born 1986), Former college basketballer and Australian rules footballer
 Helen Rollason (1956–1999), British sports journalist and television presenter
 Helen Shapiro (born 1946), English singer
 Helen Sjöholm (born 1970), Swedish singer
 Helen Slater (born 1963), American actress
 Helen Slayton-Hughes (1930–2022), American actress
 Helen Southworth (born 1956), British politician
 Helen Ekin Starrett (1840–1920), American educator, author, suffragette 	
 Helen Stephens (1918–1994), American athlete
 Helen Stewart (1900–1983), New Zealand painter
 Helen Svedin (born 1976), Swedish model
 Helen Sworn, English Baptist missionary
 Helen Tamiris (1905–1966), American choreographer
 Helen Rand Thayer (1863–1935), American social reformer
 Helen Thomas (1920–2013), American reporter and author
 Helena Thopia (fl. 1388–1403), Albanian princess
 Helen Tobias-Duesberg (1919–2010), Estonian-American composer
 Helen Va'aga (born 1977), New Zealand rugby player and coach
 Helen Volk (born 1954), Zimbabwean field hockey player
 Helen M. Winslow (1851–1938), American author, journalist 	
 Helen Wong Smith, American archivist and librarian 	
 Helen Zille (born 1951), South African politician
 Helen Haines (born 1961), Australian politician

Fictional
 Helen, a character in 1990 American fantasy romance movie Edward Scissorhands
 Helen Buckman, a character in the 1989 American family comedy-drama movie Parenthood
 Helen Dubois, character from the sitcom Drake & Josh
 Helen Manson, a character in the 1940 American horror science fiction film The Invisible Man Returns
 Helen Morgendorffer, character from the animated sitcom Daria
 Helen Lorraine, the owner of Martha in Martha Speaks
 Helen Henny, one of the mascots from Chuck E Cheese
 Helen Parr, a character from The Incredibles franchise
 Helen Park, a character from the video game Call of Duty: Black Ops Cold War
 Helen Shyres, a character from the book Carrie
 Helen Underwood, a character from the Canadian comedy television series Dog House

See also
 Eilidh
 Eleanor
 Ellen (given name)
 Helen (disambiguation)

References

English feminine given names
Estonian feminine given names
Given names of Greek language origin
Greek feminine given names
Swedish feminine given names